Sha'ar ha Gilgulim (Gate of Reincarnations, שער הגלגולים) is a kabbalistic work on Gilgul, the concept of reincarnation put together by Rabbi Hayyim Vital who recorded the teachings of his master in the 16th century CE.

Authors
Based primarily on the Zohar (זהר) ("Splendor"), the section Mishpatim (מִּשְׁפָּטִים "laws"), where gilgulim are discussed, it also borrows heavily from the teachings of the prominent Kabbalist Rabbi Isaac Luria (1534-1572), otherwise known as the "Arizal". The book was composed by the Arizal's main disciple Rabbi Hayyim (or Chaim) Vital and amended by his son Rabbi Shmuel Vital, as a section or "gate", of the primary Kabbalistic text Etz Hayim, (עץ חיים, "Tree [of] Life").

Contents
As well as outlining principles of personal rectification or Tikkun, and reincarnation, this work describes the spiritual roots of many of the great Torah scholars of the past. Furthermore, it often provides information about the future in terms of predicting challenges to be expected throughout Jewish history and particularly the "End of Days".

References

External links 
Gate of Reincarnations - classics

Kabbalah texts
Books about reincarnation
Isaac Luria